was a Japanese ski jumping sports official who was best known for taking the Judge's Oath at the 1972 Winter Olympics in Sapporo. Asaki was the first judge to do so in the Olympic Games.

References
IOC 1972 Winter Olympics
Wendl, Karel. "The Olympic Oath - A Brief History" Citius, Altius, Fortius (Journal of Olympic History since 1997). Winter 1995. pp. 4,5.

External links

Japanese sportspeople
Possibly living people
Japanese referees and umpires
Year of birth missing
Olympic officials
Oath takers at the Olympic Games